Plaster Creek is a  urban stream in Kent County, Michigan in the United States. It is a tributary of the Grand River.  The stream is named for the large deposit of gypsum found at its mouth. Its mean monthly flow averages 22 million gallons per day.

Two bridges listed on the National Register of Historic Places cross the creek.

Watershed
The headwaters are located in Dutton Shadyside Park, at Hanna Lake Avenue and 76th Street, just south of the unincorporated town of Dutton in Gaines Township. The creek flows into the Grand River just south of Wealthy Street in downtown Grand Rapids.

Flora and fauna
Plaster Creek is a salmon spawning stream, and salmon have been seen as far upstream as the headwaters at Dutton Shadyside Park. The stream is not considered to be a trout stream, but has been designated as a warm water fishery.  One endangered species Epioblasma triquetra (the snuffbox mussel) lives in the Plaster Creek watershed.  The threatened Beak Grass (Diarrhena americana) grows along the banks in some areas.

Tributaries
Streams flowing into the creek include Little Plaster Creek, the small Maple Creek, and the former Silver Creek, now culverted as the Silver Creek Drain.

Trails
A series of trails along Plaster Creek is being planned in Grand Rapids:

Plaster Creek Trail - Phase I
Beginning at Ken-O-Sha Park School (1353 VanAuken SE) and following Plaster Creek, this pathway offers interpretive signs and a stunning display of spring-blooming wild flowers along the creek's bank and wetland areas.

Plaster Creek Trail - Phase II
It starts at Plaster Creek and Eastern Avenue, travels north on the east side of Eastern Avenue, crosses 28th Street, then proceeds westerly to Division Avenue. The trail serves two purposes, as a non-motorized trail and as a flood protection and mitigation facility.

Plaster Creek Trail - Phase III
Division Avenue to Oxford Street.

Eventually, this trail will connect with Kent Trails and the Paul Henry-Thornapple Rail Trail.

References

Geography of Grand Rapids, Michigan
Rivers of Kent County, Michigan
Rivers of Michigan
Tributaries of Lake Michigan